The Challenge Millesime Bio was established in 2007 by Sudvinbio winegrowers. It is the world’s largest organic wine festival and the Millésime Bio Fair’s official contest. Over 1,600 organic wines are presented from around the world with 1,612 wines from 13 countries in 2020.

Recent events have been chaired by:

 2019: Philippe Faure Brac
 2020: Jean Luc Rabanel
 2021: (in totally digital format), Andrew Jefford.

Some of the recent award winners include:

 2011: Paco Morales and  Pepe Rodríguez Rey
 2012: Gold Medal Special Jury Award Winner (Timo Dienhart for Edition Bee – Beetle Dry Riesling, 2010 Vintage), Philippe Goulley for Simone Tremblay, AOP Chablis Premier Cru Fourchame, 2009 Vintage, Fanny Monbouché for AOP Monbazillac 2009 Vintage and Pascal Fraychet for AOC Baux de Provence Red 2007 Vintage
 2013: (20th anniversary): Gold Medal to Figure Libre Cabernet Franc 2011
 2018: Domaine Gayda Chemin de Moscou 2015
 2019: Chapelle de Novilis, Evolus White 2016
 2020: Golden Award for Cuvée Sous la Croix.

References 

Wine festivals